Myllypuro (Finnish), Kvarnbäcken (Swedish) is an East Helsinki's neighborhood of Helsinki, Finland.

Neighbourhoods of Helsinki